"All My Love" is the sixth song on Led Zeppelin's 1979 album In Through the Out Door. Credited to Robert Plant and John Paul Jones, it is a rock ballad that features a synthesizer solo by Jones.  It was written in honour of Plant's son Karac, who died while Led Zeppelin were on their 1977 North American tour.

"All My Love" is one of only two Led Zeppelin songs that Jimmy Page had no part in writing (the other being "South Bound Saurez", also from In Through the Out Door).

Recording and releases
"All My Love" is a mid-tempo rock-style ballad, that biographer Nigel Williamson describes as "underpinned by a semi-classical arrangement of the kind popular at the time with the likes of Genesis and ELO".  The original working title was "The Hook".  The song was recorded between November and December 1978 at Polar Studios in Stockholm, Sweden. A studio outtake of an extended version of the song exists timed around 7:55 (the song itself would be timed around 6:57). It has a complete ending, with Plant extending the last chorus with much ad-libbing and a twangy B-Bender guitar solo by Page. This version is found on several Led Zeppelin bootleg recordings.

Led Zeppelin performed the song during their concert tour of Europe in 1980. "All My Love" is also included in the Led Zeppelin compilations Early Days and Latter Days, Remasters and Mothership.

Critical reception
In a review for In Through the Out Door (Deluxe Edition), Andrew Doscas of PopMatters described "All My Love" as "the saddest and most heartfelt Zeppelin song." Doscas described the song as "a fitting ode to Plant's son, which hauntingly enough sounds like a foreshadowing of a band on the path to an impending and unforeseeable dissolution.

In its 1999 list of "Top 500 Tracks", Radio Caroline ranked the song at number 239.

In an interview he later gave to rock journalist Cameron Crowe, Plant stated that this song was one of Led Zeppelin's "finest moments". However, guitarist Jimmy Page and drummer John Bonham had reservations about the song's soft rock sound.

The Hook
A mono mix of the song was re-released in 2015 on In Through the Out Door (Deluxe Edition), under the title "The Hook".

See also
List of cover versions of Led Zeppelin songs"All My Love" entries

References

Sources

External links
 

1979 songs
1970s ballads
Led Zeppelin songs
Rock ballads
Songs written by John Paul Jones (musician)
Songs written by Robert Plant
Song recordings produced by Jimmy Page
Commemoration songs
Swan Song Records singles
British soft rock songs